Donald Trump, the 45th President of the United States, was involved in numerous security incidents, including assassination threats and attempts. The first known attempt occurred before Trump was the official  Republican nominee, at a campaign rally during the  2016 presidential election.

2016 Donald Trump Las Vegas rally incident 

On June 18, 2016, Trump was giving a speech at the Treasure Island Hotel and Casino in Las Vegas, Nevada as part of his presidential campaign. During the speech, Michael Steven Sandford, a 20-year-old British man, attempted to grab a Las Vegas Metropolitan Police officer's pistol. The officer quickly subdued Sandford and he was arrested and handed over to the United States Secret Service, where he expressed his desire to murder Trump, claiming if he (Trump) were on the street tomorrow, he would try this again. Sandford was later sentenced to 12 months and one day's imprisonment, along with being fined $200. After becoming eligible for early release, Sandford was released and deported to the United Kingdom in May 2017.

2016 Reno "gun" scare 
On November 5, 2016, three days before the presidential election, Trump was speaking at a rally in Reno, Nevada when a man in the crowd screamed "gun", causing Trump to be rushed off stage by security and the man to be tackled by surrounding members in the crowd. The man, identified as 33-year-old Austyn Daniel Crites, was subdued by Secret Service agents and searched, only to find that he was unarmed. Crites, who was a Republican that opposed Trump, was holding up a sign shortly before that stated "Republicans against Trump"; Crites stated others attempted to grab the sign and were booing him. After the scene was cleared and identified as safe, Trump returned to the stage minutes later and finished the speech without incident. Many, including Trump's son Donald Trump Jr. and his top social media aide Dan Scavino, claimed Trump survived an assassination attempt, despite the fact that Crites was unarmed and Trump was in no imminent danger.

2017 forklift attempt 
On September 6, 2017 in Mandan, North Dakota, 42-year-old Gregory Lee Leingang stole a forklift from an oil refinery and attempted to drive toward the presidential motorcade while Trump was visiting to rally public support. After the forklift became jammed within the refinery, he fled on foot and was arrested by the pursuing police. While interviewed in detention, he admitted his intent to murder the president by flipping the presidential limousine with the stolen forklift, to the surprise of authorities, who suspected he was merely thieving the vehicle for personal use. Leingang pled guilty to the attempted attack, stealing the forklift, related charges and several other unrelated crimes on the same day. Consequently, he was sentenced to 20 years in prison. His defense attorney noted a "serious psychiatric crisis".

2018 ricin attempt 
On October 1, 2018, an envelope laced with ricin was sent to Trump before being discovered by mailing facilities. Several other letters were sent to the Pentagon, all of them labeled on the front with "Jack and the Missile Bean Stock Powder". Two days later on October 3, a 39-year-old Utah Navy veteran named William Clyde Allen III was arrested and charged with one count of mailing a threat against the President and five counts of mailing threatening communications to an officer or an employee of the United States. Allen pled not guilty to all charges.

2020 ricin attempt 
On September 20, 2020, 53-year-old Pascale Cecile Veronique Ferrier was arrested in Buffalo, New York while attempting to cross over the border to Canada. Ferrier, who is Canadian, wrote in a ricin-laced letter to Trump that he should drop out of the ongoing  2020 presidential election along with calling him an “ugly tyrant clown“. She is charged with eight counts each of prohibitions with respect to biological weapons and making threats via interstate commerce and faces up to life in prison.

See also 
Security incidents involving George W. Bush
Security incidents involving Barack Obama

References 

Attempted assassinations of presidents of the United States
Presidency of Donald Trump
2016 in the United States
2017 in the United States
2018 in the United States
2020 in the United States